Akbarabad , is a town and Union Council of Kasur District in the Punjab province of Pakistan.

Reference 

Kasur District
Union councils of Kasur District